Jennifer Anne Saville  (born 7 May 1970) is a contemporary British painter and an original member of the Young British Artists. Saville works and lives in Oxford, England and she is known for her large-scale painted depictions of nude women. Saville has been credited with originating a new and challenging method of painting the female nude and reinventing figure painting for contemporary art. Some paintings are of small dimensions, while other are of much larger scale. Monumental subjects come from pathology textbooks that she has studied that informed her on injury to bruise, burns, and deformity. John Gray commented: "As I see it, Jenny Saville's work expresses a parallel project of reclaiming the body from personality. Saville worked with many models who under went cosmetic surgery to reshape a portion of their body. In doing that, she captures "marks of personality for the flesh" and together embraces how we can be the writers of our own lives."

Early life and education
Saville was born  in Cambridge, England. Saville went to the Lilley and Stone School (now The Newark Academy) in Newark, Nottinghamshire, for her secondary education, later gaining her Bachelor of Fine Arts degree at Glasgow School of Art (1988–1992). She was then awarded a six-month scholarship to the University of Cincinnati where she enrolled in a course in women's studies. Saville was exposed to gender political ideas and renowned feminist writers.  During her time in Cincinnati, she saw a lot of big women in shorts and t-shirts. This was the kind of physicality that she found herself interested in. She partially credits her interest in big bodies to Pablo Picasso, an artist that she sees as a painter that made his subjects solid and permanent.

Career
At the end of Saville's undergraduate education, the leading British art collector, Charles Saatchi, saw her work at Clare Henry's Critics Choice exhibition at the Cooling Gallery in Cork St and purchased a painting. Her first series of paintings consisted of large scale portraits of Saville and other models. He offered the artist an 18-month contract, supporting her while she created new works to be exhibited in the Saatchi Gallery in London. The collection, Young British Artists III, exhibited in 1994 with Saville's self-portrait, Plan (1993), as the signature piece. Rising quickly to critical and public recognition and emerging as part of the Young British Artists (YBA) scene, Saville has been noted for creating art through the use of a classical standard—figure painting, but with a contemporary approach.

Since her debut in 1992, Saville's focus has remained on the female body.  She has stated, "I'm drawn to bodies that emanate a sort of state of in-betweenness: hermaphrodite, a transvestite, a carcass, a half-alive/half-dead head." In 1994, Saville spent many hours observing plastic surgery operations in New York City. Her published sketches and documents include surgical photographs of liposuction, trauma victims, deformity correction, disease states, and transgender patients. Much of her work features distorted flesh, high-caliber brush strokes, and patches of oil color, while others reveal the surgeon's mark of a plastic surgery operation or white "target" rings. Her paintings are usually much larger than life-size, usually six-by-six feet or more. They are strongly pigmented and give a highly sensual impression of the surface of the skin as well as the mass of the body. Saville's post-painterly style has been compared to that of Lucian Freud and Rubens.

Album covers
In 1994, Saville's painting Strategy (South Face/Front Face/North Face) appeared on the cover of Manic Street Preachers' third album The Holy Bible. Saville's painting Stare (2005) was used for the cover of the band's 2009 album Journal for Plague Lovers. The top four UK supermarkets stocked the CD in a plain slipcase, after the cover was deemed "inappropriate". The band's James Dean Bradfield said the decision was "utterly bizarre", and commented: "You can have lovely shiny buttocks and guns everywhere in the supermarket on covers of magazines and CDs, but you show a piece of art and people just freak out". The album cover art placed second in a 2009 poll for Best Art Vinyl.

Recent work
In 2002, she collaborated with photographer Glen Luchford to produce huge Polaroids of herself taken from below, lying on a sheet of glass. Luchford is a well-known fashion photographer who worked for Gucci, Calvin Klein, and Prada. Saville wanted to use someone with Luchford's high fashion background to capture her interpretations of the female form.

In Saville's more recent work, she employs graphite, charcoal, and pastel to explore overlapping forms suggestive of underdrawings, movement, hybridity, and gender ambiguity. Saville states, "If I draw through previous bodily forms in an arbitrary or contradictory way; ...it gives the work a kind of life force or EROS.  Destruction, regeneration, a cyclic rhythm of emerging forms".

Later, in 2018 Saville's Propped (1992) sold at Sothebys' in London for £9.5 million, above its £3-£4 million estimate, becoming the most expensive work by a living female artist sold at auction.

Representations of the body
Representations of the body is an important aspect of Jenny Saville's work. Saville's stylized nude portraits of voluminous female bodies have brought her international acclaim. She attributes most of her style and subjects to this theme of representations. Savilles' work Propped (1992), which is the most expensive work sold at an auction house by a living female artist, has been described as "one of the undisputed masterpieces of the Young British Artists" by Sothebys' European head of Contemporary Art, Alex Branczik. This piece is said to be so masterful because it is  "the superlative self-portrait that shatters canonized representations of female beauty."

In an interview for the Saatchi Gallery, Saville comments "I have to really work at the tension between getting the paint to have the sensory quality that I want and be constructive in terms of building the form of a stomach, for example, or creating the inner crevice of a thigh. The more I do it, the more the space between abstraction and figuration becomes interesting. I want a painting realism. I try to consider the pace of a painting, of active and quiet areas. Listening to music helps a lot, especially music where there's a hard sound and then soft breathable passages."

Saville's art focuses on women's bodies as the predominant subject matter, and is a far cry away from other works of the female form, which have traditionally objectified women. She is more interested in the raw and unaltered female form, and the valuable reactions of disgust which are generated when viewing her pieces. Her body of work therefore challenges traditional representations of nude women and also the modern-day filtered and perfect body image, encouraged by social media. Saville does this by focusing on the bumps, dimples, rolls and contours of women's bodies and flesh, representing some insecurities and imperfections, that have been excluded in depictions of nude women traditionally.

Saville's work was included in the 2022 exhibition Women Painting Women at the Modern Art Museum of Fort Worth.

Technique and color choices
Saville's technique uses small brushstrokes to build up the painting and soften the imaging. The finish of the painting is matte, but it does not look "dry". She also uses interesting, muted color combinations for her art pieces that create a soft atmosphere free of harshness with an intense subject and meaning behind it. Other complementary analyzes have been proposed on the technique: While drawing upon a wide range of sources it is normal that a painting "capture a sense of motion and fluidity. These restless images provide no fixed point, but rather suggest the perception of simultaneous realities". Kenny Smith. "She found a way to niche gender studies within a late flowering of the grand tradition of the swagger portrait ... Saville's provocative twist was to extend the bravura technique and monumental scale of such painting to naked and isolated (or in some cases sardined) young women". David Cohen.  Saville works with oil paint, applied in heavy layers, becomes as visceral as flesh itself, each painted mark maintaining a supple, mobile life of its own. As Saville pushes, smears, and scrapes the pigment over her large-scale canvases. Saville is also known for her use of massive canvases that allow the viewer to see the details and layering of oil paints to create her signature aesthetic of movement and abstract realism.

Aesthetics and subject matter
Traditionally, Jenny Saville's nudes have been studied from the gender perspective defying "the traditional aspects of beauty and femininity. In fact, most of her nudes represent overweight or bruised women ... constant struggle between the female body and the body ideals contemporary pop culture has been trying to force upon it" (Marilia Kaisar). Meagher writes that Saville sees standards of "beauty and pleasure [as] deeply embedded within Western [culture]", yet, she constantly tries to challenge these assumptions of the body and beauty.

Her nonconventional looks at beauty expands the traditional nude form into a way to comment on the body, gender politics, sexuality, and even self-realization. Her works often "depict distorted, fleshy, and disquieting female bodies" to provoke interest, confusion, questions, and excitement. Saville’s luscious yet grotesque treatment of painted bodies have elicited comparisons to Lucian Freud. "I paint flesh because I'm human", she has said. "If you work in oil, as I do, it comes naturally. Flesh is just the most beautiful thing to paint." "A confrontation with the dynamics of exposure ... her exaggerated nudes point up, with an agonizing frankness, the disparity between the way women are perceived and the way that they feel about their bodies" (Suzie Mackenzie). She plays upon the "ambiguity of embodiment" and what it means to be "feminine" or "beautiful" through the use of the distortion and "disgust". This "aesthetic of disgust" pushed people to the uncomfortable and forced many into the shoes of countless women in the Western world, giving some the autonomy to decide their own standard of beauty beyond society. The primary subject of all of Saville’s early works is the artist herself, and indeed throughout her oeuvre she has almost exclusively painted female subjects. Scholars like Loren Erdrich argue there is a direct link between the physical body, identity, and the self presented within Saville's subjects.

Society shapes and seeks to control behavior, relationships, and power. Saville, however, breaks down the social conventions that encourage women to fit into limiting beauty standards. Saville's subject, non-idealized bodies, have been understood as superposition of mental and emotional mindsets: "if we could see through our skins our psychological injuries, then the process will be clear: every injury and excess is hiding from the surface (in every successfully avoided blushing) it goes to our inner body (where it avoids to be noticed)" (Luis Alberto Mejia Clavijo). Through the mediation of paint, Saville restores beauty and subjectivity to bodies that have been in what is seen as grotesque. In her own words: "A lot of women out there look and feel like that, made to fear their own excess, taken in by the cult of exercise, the great quest to be thin. The rhetoric used against obesity makes it sound far worse than alcohol or smoking, yet they can do you far more damage". It is acknowledged that Saville performs "explorations of people that are both intimate and uncomfortable. Through detailed, frank and unapologetic investigations of the human body, dialogues occur between past and present, and are animated by questions of gender, suffering, and ambiguity" (Asana Greenstreet).

From the beginning of her career, Saville has engaged in an intense exploration of the body and its representation. Saville borrows conventions from a long tradition in figure painting, whether in poses borrowed from Madonna and Child paintings by Leonardo da Vinci, the use of a color palette reminiscent of Peter Paul Rubens, or the gestural painting of Willem de Kooning in his Woman series. Saville appropriates these techniques associated with male masters to show her own point of view as a woman.

In 2004, Saville explored the idea of floating gender in her work Passage. Saville is quoted saying "With the transvestite I was searching for a body that was between genders. I had explored that idea a little in Matrix. The idea of floating gender that is not fixed. The transvestite I worked with has a natural penis and false silicone breasts. Thirty or forty years ago this body couldn't have existed and I was looking for a kind of contemporary architecture of the body. I wanted to paint a visual passage through gender – a sort of gender landscape."

Select works
Branded (1992). Oil painting on a  canvas. In this painting, Saville painted her own face onto an obese female body. The size of the breasts and midsection is very exaggerated. The figure in the painting is holding folds of her skin which she is seemingly showing off.
Plan (1993). Oil painting on a  canvas. This painting depicts a nude female figure with contour lines marked on her body, much like that of a topographical map. Saville said of this work: "The lines on her body are the marks they make before you have liposuction done to you. They draw these things that look like targets. I like this idea of mapping of the body, not necessarily areas to be cut away, but like geographical contours on a map. I didn't draw on to the body. I wanted the idea of cutting into the paint. Like you would cut into the body. It evokes the idea of surgery. It has lots of connotations."
Closed Contact (1995–1996). She collaborated with artist Glen Luchford to create a series of C-prints depicting a larger female nude lying on plexiglass. The photographs were taken from underneath the glass and depict the female figure very distorted.
Hybrid (1997). Oil painting on a  canvas. In this painting, the image looks much like patchwork. Different components of four female bodies are incorporated together to create a unique piece.
Fulcrum (1999). Oil painting on an  canvas. In this painting, three obese women are piled on a medical trolley. Thin vertical strips of tape have been painted over and then pulled off the canvas, thus creating a sense of geometric measure at odds with the mountainous flesh.
Hem (1999). Oil painting on a  canvas. This painting depicts a very large nude female with lots of subtle textures implied. The bits of orange showing through the stomach add a glow, while the figure's left side is covered with thick white paint as if by a plaster cast, and her pubic area, painted pink over dark brown, resembles carved painted wood.
Ruben's Flap (1998–1999). Oil painting on a  canvas. This painting depicts Saville herself; she multiplies her body, letting it fill the canvas space as it does in other works, but what is interesting is the fragmentation. Decisive lines divide the body into square planes, and it appears that she is trying to hide the nakedness with the different planes. Saville seems to be struggling to convince herself that the parts of her body are beautiful.
Matrix (1999). Oil painting on a  canvas. In this painting, Saville depicts a reclining nude figure with female breasts and genitalia, but with a masculine, bearded face. The genitalia is thrust to the foreground, making it much more of a focus in the picture than the gaze. The arms and legs of the figure are only partly seen, the extremities lying outside the boundary of the picture. The whole is painted in fairly naturalistic fleshy tones.

Exhibitions
 1992 – Cooling Gallery, London, UK (when Saatchi bought her one work on show)
 1994 – "Young British Artists III", Saatchi Gallery, London, UK
 1996 – "Contemporary British Art '96", Museum of Kalmar, Stockholm, Sweden
 1996 – "A Collaboration", in collaboration with Glen Luchford, Pace/McGill Gallery, New York, US
 1997 – 'Sensation', Royal Academy of Art, London, UK (brought Saville's work to the attention of the British public at large)
 1999 – "Territories", Gagosian Gallery, New York (SoHo), US (first major solo exhibit)
 2002 – "Closed Contact", in collaboration with Glen Luchford, Gagosian Gallery, Beverly Hills, California, US
 2003 – "Migrants", Gagosian Gallery, New York (Chelsea), US
 2004 – Large Scale Polaroids by Jenny Saville and Glen Luchford, University of Massachusetts Amherst, East Gallery
 2005 – Solo Exhibition, Museo d'Arte Contemporanea Roma, Rome
 2006 – inaugural exhibition, Museo Carlo Billoti, Rome, Italy
 2010 – Gagosian Gallery, London, UK
 2011 – "Continuum", Gagosian Gallery, New York City, US
 2012 – "Jenny Saville, Solo Show", Norton Museum of Art, West Palm Beach, Florida, US. (Part of the Norton's RAW series – Recognition of Art by Women)
 2012 – Jenny Saville's first UK solo exhibition was held at Modern Art Oxford.+
 2014 – "Egon Schiele - Jenny Saville", Kunsthaus Zürich, Zürich, CH
 2016 – 'Jenny Saville Drawing', Ashmolean Museum, Venice, Italy. (Formed the final section of the 'Titian to Canaletto: Drawing in Venice' exhibition). Twenty new works on paper and canvas were produced in response to the Venetian drawings in the exhibition.
 2016 – "Erota", Gagosian Gallery, London, UK. This exhibition held recent drawings inspired by the previous "Titian to Canaletto: Drawing in Venice" exhibition.
"Ancestors", 3 May – 23 July 2018 at Gagosian Gallery, 522 West 21st Street, New York
 2018 – "Now", Scottish National Gallery of Modern Art, Scotland, UK (during the Edinburgh Art Festival)
 2018 – "Jenny Saville", The George Economou Collection, Athens, Greece

Other activities
 Gagosian Gallery, Member of the Board of Directors (since 2022)

References

Notes
Jenny Saville, Organized by Cheryl Brutvan, Texts by Cheryl Brutvan and Nicholas Cullinan, Norton Museum of Art, West Palm Beach, Florida, 2011.

External links
Royal Academy of Arts profile page
Jenny Saville at Gagosian Gallery
Jenny Saville at the Saatchi Gallery
Jenny Saville on Widewalls.ch
at the Norton Museum of Art
Saville on artfact.com
Saville in the New York Times

1970 births
Living people
20th-century English painters
21st-century English painters
20th-century English women artists
21st-century English women artists
Album-cover and concert-poster artists
Alumni of the Glasgow School of Art
Alumni of the Slade School of Fine Art
Artists from Cambridge
British contemporary painters
English contemporary artists
English women painters
Feminist artists
People from Newark-on-Trent
Royal Academicians
University of Cincinnati alumni